An original member of the K-League founded on 17 December 1983, the team was then called the Yukong Elephants.  Yukong was owned and financially supported by the Sunkyoung Group's subsidiary, Yukong (currently SK Group's "SK Energy"), along with Seoul, Incheon, Gyeonggi as its franchise.  The Kokkiri ("elephant) was its mascot.  The club won the league championship on only one occasion (in 1989).

Jeju United FC (Yukong Elephants) seasons 1983-1995 statistics 
{|class="wikitable"
|-bgcolor="#efefef"
! Season
! K-League
! Played
! W
! D
! L
! F
! A
! PTS
! League Cup
! FA Cup
! Manager
|-
|1983
|align=right|3rd
|align=right|16
|align=right|5
|align=right|7
|align=right|4
|align=right|26
|align=right|24
|align=right|17
|
|
|Lee Jong-Hwan
|-
|1984
|align=right|Runners-up
|align=right|28
|align=right|13
|align=right|9
|align=right|6
|align=right|38
|align=right|22
|align=right|53
|
|
|Lee Jong-Hwan
|-
|1985
|align=right|5th
|align=right|21
|align=right|7
|align=right|5
|align=right|9
|align=right|28
|align=right|26
|align=right|19
|
|
|Lee Jong-Hwan / Kim Jung-Nam
|-
|1986
|align=right|4th
|align=right|20
|align=right|7
|align=right|5
|align=right|8
|align=right|29
|align=right|26
|align=right|19
|align=right|3위
|
|Kim Jung-Nam
|-
|1987
|align=right|3rd
|align=right|32
|align=right|9
|align=right|9
|align=right|14
|align=right|34
|align=right|43
|align=right|27
|
|
|Kim Jung-Nam
|-
|1988
|align=right|3rd
|align=right|24
|align=right|8
|align=right|8
|align=right|8
|align=right|25
|align=right|24
|align=right|24
|
|
|Kim Jung-Nam
|-
|1989
|align=right|Winner
|align=right|40
|align=right|17
|align=right|15
|align=right|8
|align=right|51
|align=right|40
|align=right|49
|
|
|Kim Jung-Nam
|-
|1990
|align=right|4th
|align=right|30
|align=right|8
|align=right|12
|align=right|10
|align=right|27
|align=right|30
|align=right|28
|
|
|Kim Jung-Nam
|-
|1991
|align=right|4th
|align=right|40
|align=right|10
|align=right|17
|align=right|13
|align=right|38
|align=right|40
|align=right|37
|
|
|Kim Jung-Nam
|-
|1992
|align=right|6th
|align=right|30
|align=right|7
|align=right|8
|align=right|15
|align=right|33
|align=right|38
|align=right|22
|align=right|4th
|
|Kim Jung-Nam
|-
|1993
|align=right|5th
|align=right|30
|align=right|14
|align=right|9
|align=right|16
|align=right|25
|align=right|31
|align=right|48
|align=right|6th
|
|Park Sung-Wha
|-
|1994
|align=right|Runners-up
|align=right|30
|align=right|14
|align=right|9
|align=right|7
|align=right|47
|align=right|31
|align=right|51
|align=right|Winner
|
|Park Sung-Wha
|-
|1995
|align=right|4th
|align=right|28
|align=right|9
|align=right|9
|align=right|10
|align=right|28
|align=right|30
|align=right|36
|align=right|5th
|
|Valeri Nepomniachi
|-
|}

References 
 Jeju United FC 30 years History on official website

1983-1995